Long Day's Journey into Night is a film by Canadian director David Wellington, released in 1996. An adaptation of Eugene O'Neill's 1956 play Long Day's Journey into Night, the film starred William Hutt as James, Martha Henry as Mary, Peter Donaldson as Jamie, Tom McCamus as Edmund and Martha Burns as Cathleen.

The same cast had performed the play at Canada's Stratford Festival from 1994 to 1996; Wellington essentially filmed the stage production without significant changes.

The film swept the acting awards at the 17th Genie Awards, winning awards for Hutt as Best Actor, Henry as Best Actress, Donaldson as Best Supporting Actor and Burns as Best Supporting Actress. McCamus was also nominated for Best Actor, losing to Hutt. It was named Best Canadian Film at the 1996 Toronto International Film Festival.

This version was later aired by PBS on its Great Performances series in 1999.

References

External links

1996 films
Canadian drama films
English-language Canadian films
Films based on works by Eugene O'Neill
Films directed by David Wellington
1990s English-language films
1990s Canadian films
Films set in Connecticut